Maria Francis (Lund) (born 1969) is a British and Welsh slalom canoeist who competed in the 1980s and 1990s. She was women's K1 British Champion in 1989, silver medalist at the 1990 Europa Cup in Merano and went on to win a bronze medal in the K1 team event at the 1993 ICF Canoe Slalom World Championships in Mezzana.

Maria (now Maria Worrall, married to Photographer Chris Worrall) lives in Cambridge (UK) and is a member of Bishop's Stortford Canoe Club. She currently works for the NHS at Addenbrooke's Hospital, Cambridge.

Other notable results 
 silver medal at the 1990 ICF Canoe Slalom Europa Cup race in Merano
 gold medal at the 1989 BCU Canoe Slalom Championships
 gold medal at the 1989 BCU Canoe Slalom Open Championships in Llangollen
 silver medal at International Canoe Slalom race in Llangollen (1994)
 gold medal at the 1987 ICF Canoe Slalom Junior Pre-worlds race in La Seu D'Urgell
 silver medal at the 1987 ICF Canoe Slalom Euro Youth Championships in Spittal

References

Cardiff International White Water - Dŵr Gwyn Rhyngwladol Caerdydd
Slalom Medal Winners from 1946 to 2006 - British Canoe Union
Welsh Canoe Association - Canw Cymru
British Canoeing
The website of UK Canoe Slalom

British female canoeists
Welsh female canoeists
Living people
1969 births
Place of birth missing (living people)
Medalists at the ICF Canoe Slalom World Championships